Laodicea, also transliterated as Laodiceia or Laodikeia, was an ancient city of Arcadia, in the Peloponnese, Greece. It is located between Megalopolis and Oresthasion (Orestium).

See also 
 List of ancient Greek cities

External links
Hazlitt, Classical Gazetteer, "Laodicea"

Cities in ancient Peloponnese
Geography of ancient Arcadia
Former populated places in Greece